Lorcan Robbins (also called Laurence and/or Robins) (born 16 May 1884 – 9 January 1939) was an Irish Sinn Féin activist and politician.  He was the son of Laurence Dalton Robins, a farmer from Tullaghnageeragh near Moate in County Westmeath, who worked undercover for Sinn Féin under the alias "Richard Dalton".

When the First Dáil established the separatist Irish Republic in 1919, the younger Robbins worked in the Dáil government's Department of Finance. He was nominated as a Sinn Féin candidate in the Longford–Westmeath constituency at the 1921 general election. Arthur Griffith suggested that, if elected, he be excused attendance at the Dáil in order to continue working for the Department of Finance; Michael Collins overruled Griffith. Robbins and the other Sinn Féin candidates were returned unopposed as TDs to the Second Dáil.

On 7 January 1922, he voted in favour of the Anglo-Irish Treaty. On 11 January he was appointed Assistant Minister for Local Government in the post-Treaty Dáil government, although this appointment was never ratified by the Dáil.  He lost his Dáil seat at the 1922 general election, although he remained an Assistant Minister until the Dáil government was merged with the Provisional Government in September.

References

1884 births
1939 deaths
Members of the 2nd Dáil
Early Sinn Féin TDs
Politicians from County Westmeath
People from Moate